Lonking Holdings Limited, formerly China Infrastructure Machinery Holdings Limited (CIMH), is one of the largest private manufacturers of construction machinery in Longyan, Fujian, China. It is involved in the manufacturing and distribution of wheel loaders, road rollers, excavators and forklifts. It has 18 wholly owned subsidiaries at present.

The company was established in 1993. It was listed on the Hong Kong Stock Exchange in 2005. In 2008, its English name was changed from China Infrastructure Machinery Holdings Limited to Lonking Holdings Limited. The company manufactures wheel loaders, excavators, road rollers, motor graders, forklifts and their components such as transmissions, torque converters, axles, hydraulic components, gears, tubes & hoses, drive shafts, etc.

References

External links
Official website

Companies listed on the Hong Kong Stock Exchange
Companies based in Longyan
Construction equipment manufacturers of China
Manufacturing companies established in 1993
Manufacturing companies of China
Privately held companies of China
Chinese brands
1993 establishments in China